Cauchas simpliciella is a moth of the Adelidae family or fairy longhorn moths. It was described by Walsingham in 1880. It is found from Montana to the Pacific north-west of North America and south along the coast, including British Columbia and California.

References

Adelidae
Moths described in 1880
Moths of North America